Moti Bazaar is an old bazaar located in Rawalpindi, Pakistan.

History
It was founded by Moti Lal in 1911.

Prior to the establishment of Pakistan in 1947, the bazaar had only twenty-two shops. The total number of these stores has now surpassed 1200. Every day, at least 8,000 people visit and shop in Moti Bazaar. Previously, this bazaar was solely for ladies, but now males and teenagers can visit the bazaar.

There is a mansion in the heart of the marketplace that serves as a school today. This residence was erected in 1883 and given the name Kanya Ashra in honour of Moti Lal's wife.

References

1911 establishments in British India
Tourist attractions in Rawalpindi
Shopping districts and streets in Pakistan
Populated places in Rawalpindi City
Rawalpindi City
Bazaars in Rawalpindi